The 2023 Puerto Vallarta Open was a professional tennis tournament played on hard courts. It was the fourth edition of the tournament which was part of the 2023 ATP Challenger Tour. It took place in Puerto Vallarta, Mexico between 6 and 12 March 2023.

Singles main-draw entrants

Seeds

 1 Rankings are as of 27 February 2023.

Other entrants
The following players received wildcards into the singles main draw:
  Luca Lemaitre
  Rodrigo Pacheco Méndez
  Alan Fernando Rubio Fierros

The following players received entry into the singles main draw using protected rankings:
  Alex Bolt
  Bjorn Fratangelo

The following players received entry into the singles main draw as alternates:
  Ulises Blanch
  Daniel Rincón
  Yuta Shimizu

The following players received entry from the qualifying draw:
  Guido Andreozzi
  Jacopo Berrettini
  Christian Langmo
  Illya Marchenko
  James McCabe
  Rubin Statham

Champions

Singles
 
 Benoît Paire def.  Yuta Shimizu 3–6, 6–0, 6–2.

Doubles

 Robert Galloway /  Miguel Ángel Reyes-Varela def.  André Göransson /  Ben McLachlan 3–0 retired.

References

2023 ATP Challenger Tour
2023 in Mexican tennis
March 2023 sports events in Mexico